School for Coquettes (French:L'École des cocottes) may refer to:

 School for Coquettes (play), a 1918 play by Marcel Gerbidon and Paul Armont
 School for Coquettes (1935 film), a 1935 film adaptation
 School for Coquettes (1958 film), a 1958 film adaptation